Piégut-Pluviers is a commune in the Dordogne department in Nouvelle-Aquitaine in southwestern France.

Population

History
In Gallo-Roman times the place was called Podium Acutum. The castle was destroyed by Richard Lionheart in 1199, only the tower is still to be seen. The market on Wednesday morning has been held here since the seventeenth century.

See also
Communes of the Dordogne department

References

Communes of Dordogne